"Wrap My Words Around You" is the second single from New Zealand-British singer Daniel Bedingfield's second studio album, Second First Impression (2004). It peaked at number 12 on the UK Singles Chart and number 30 on the Irish and Swiss charts.

Track listings
UK CD1 and European CD single
 "Wrap My Words Around You"
 "Do Ya" (album version with Lionel Richie)

UK CD2
 "Wrap My Words Around You"
 "Nothing Hurts Like Love" (piano and vocal version)
 "Wrap My Words Around You" (live from Capital Radio)
 "Growing Up"

European maxi-CD single
 "Wrap My Words Around You"
 "Nothing Hurts Like Love" (piano and vocal version)
 "Wrap My Words Around You" (live from Capital Radio)
 "Do Ya" (with Lionel Richie)

Credits and personnel
Credits are lifted from the UK CD1 liner notes.

Studios
 Recorded and mixed at Ocean Way Studios (Hollywood, California)
 Mastered at Gateway Mastering (Portland, Maine, US)

Personnel

 Daniel Bedingfield – writing, vocals, beatboxing, programming, co-production, analogue and digital engineering
 Tim Pierce – guitars
 David Hart – guitars
 Eric Appapoulay – guitars
 Paul Bushnell – bass
 Adam Dietch – keyboards
 Erick Coomes – keyboards
 Russ Miller – drums
 Dan Chase – tambourine
 Tyler Coomes – programming
 Poet Named Life – programming
 Jack Joseph Puig – production, recording, mixing, analogue and digital engineering
 Dean Nelson – analogue and digital engineering
 Dan Chase – analogue and digital engineering
 Jake Davies – analogue and digital engineering
 Tal Herzberg – analogue and digital engineering
 Allen Sides – analogue and digital engineering
 Andy Bird – analogue and digital engineering
 Bob Ludwig – mastering

Charts

References

Daniel Bedingfield songs
2004 songs
2005 singles
Polydor Records singles
Song recordings produced by Jack Joseph Puig
Songs written by Daniel Bedingfield